The Serranía del Darién is a small mountain range on the border between Colombia and Panamá in the area called the Darién Gap. It is located in the southeastern part of the Darién Province of Panamá and the northwestern part of the Chocó Department of Colombia. There are two major protected areas here: Darién National Park in Panamá and Los Katíos National Park in Colombia. These mountains have sparse settlements, with just two people living in every square kilometer. This lack of human settlements is reflected in the fact that the nearest town with a population of 50,000 is over 12 hours by road.

Geological hazards
The Serranía del Darién is notorious for strong earthquakes; on average earthquakes measuring between 6 and 7 occur here every 50 years. The area is also susceptible to floods and landslides, both of which have been classified as medium to high intensity hazards for the region.

Climate
Serranía del Darién is a humid region. Its climate falls under the tropical monsoon type.

Flora and fauna
Species that are endemic to the Serranía del Darién include the toad Rhinella acrolopha.

References

Mountain ranges of Colombia
Mountain ranges of Panama
Landforms of Darién Province
Geography of Chocó Department